Kenneth Arthur Schischka (11 June 1912 – 16 October 1994), better known by his ring name Ken Kenneth, was a New Zealand professional wrestler.

Championships and accomplishments 
Dominion Wrestling Union
NWA Australasian Heavyweight Championship (1 time)
NWA New Zealand Heavyweight Championship (2 times)
Maple Leaf Wrestling
NWA British Empire Championship (Toronto version) (1 time)
National Wrestling Alliance
NWA Northwest Tag Team Championship (1 time) – with Tex McKenzie
Salt Lake Wrestling Club
NWA Intermountain Tag Team Championship (1 time) – with Red Donovan

References

External links
 Ken Kenneth card - Brock University

1912 births
1994 deaths
20th-century New Zealand people
20th-century professional wrestlers
New Zealand male professional wrestlers
Sportspeople from Auckland